A list of windmills in Cher, France.

External links
French windmills website

Windmills in France
Cher
Buildings and structures in Cher (department)